The 2022–23 Incarnate Word Cardinals women's basketball team represents the University of the Incarnate Word in the 2022-23 NCAA Division I women's basketball season. The Cardinals are led by coach Jeff Dow, in his fourth season, and are members of the Southland Conference.

Previous season
The Cardinals finished the 2021–22 season with a 14–17 record overall and a 5–9 record in Southland Conference play tied for fifth place with Northwestern State in the conference regular season.  Winning the regular season head-to-head with Northwestern State, the Cardinals entered the 2022 Southland Conference women's basketball tournament as the No. 5 seed.  They won the conference tournament defeating their opponents in four games from first round play through to the championship game.  They received the conference's automatic bid to the 2022 NCAA Division I women's basketball tournament.  Their season ended in the opening game of the NCAA tournament with a 51–55 loss to Howard University.

Preseason polls

Southland Conference Poll
The Southland Conference released its preseason poll on October 25, 2022. Receiving 64 votes overall, the Cardinals were picked to finish seventh in the conference.

Preseason All Conference
No Cardinals were selected as members of the Preseason All Conference first team.

Roster

Schedule
Sources:

|-
!colspan=9 style=|Non-conference regular season
|-

|-
!colspan=9 style=|Southland regular season
|-

|-
!colspan=9 style=| 2023 Jersey Mike's Subs Southland Basketball Tournament

See also
2022–23 Incarnate Word Cardinals men's basketball team

References

Incarnate Word
Incarnate Word Cardinals women's basketball seasons
Incarnate Word
Incarnate Word